Marjorie Curry Woods is an American historian of English literature, currently the Jane and Roland Blumberg Centennial Professor at and University Distinguished Teaching Professor at University of Texas at Austin.

References

Year of birth missing (living people)
Living people
University of Texas at Austin faculty
21st-century American historians
University of Toronto alumni
Stanford University alumni